Paciano Rizal Mercado y Alonso Realonda (March 9, 1851 – April 13, 1930) was a Filipino general and revolutionary, and the older brother of José Rizal, the national hero of the Philippines.

Early life
Paciano Rizal was born to Francisco Engracio Rizal Mercado y Alejandro (1818–1897) and Teodora Morales Alonso y Quintos (1827–1911; whose family later changed their surname to "Realonda"), as the second of eleven children born to a wealthy family in the town of Calamba, Laguna.

He grew up witnessing the abuses of the clergy and the Spanish colonial government. As a young student, together with Felipe Buencamino and Gregorio Sancianco, Paciano was a founding member of La Juventud Liberal, a reformist student organization that worked under the direction of the Comite de Reformadores, among whose leaders was Padre José Burgos. Among their tasks was to secretly distribute copies of the reformist paper, El Eco Filipino, while pretending to be purveyors of horse fodder (zacateros).

Burgos, who was Paciano's friend and teacher, was later implicated in the Cavite Mutiny of 1872 and summarily executed.

Revolutionary

Paciano joined and actively supported Propaganda Movement for social reforms, and supported the Movement's newspaper, Diariong Tagalog. An avid supporter of the movement, he did tasks such as collecting funds to finance the said organization, and solicited money for the nationalist paper.

In January 1897, after his younger brother's execution, Paciano joined General Emilio Aguinaldo in Cavite. He was appointed brigadier general of the revolutionary forces, and was elected Secretary of Finance in the Departmental Government of Central Luzon.

During the Philippine–American War (1899–1913), he commanded the Filipino forces in Laguna. U.S. troops captured him in Laguna on 1900. He was released soon after, and he settled in the town of Los Baños, Laguna.

Death
He lived a quiet life as a gentleman farmer, and died on April 13, 1930 at the age of 79 of tuberculosis.

Popular culture
 Portrayed by Ping Medina and Pen Medina in the 1998 film, Jose Rizal.
 Portrayed by Joonee Gamboa in the 1999 film, Bayaning 3rd World.
 Portrayed by Marco Alcaraz in the 2014 TV series, Ilustrado.

Ancestry

See also 
 (Book) Paciano Rizal: a hero missing at the Luneta - a biography of José Rizal's Big Brother.

References

1851 births
1930 deaths
People of the Philippine Revolution
People from Calamba, Laguna
Filipino Roman Catholics
Filipino people of Chinese descent
Filipino people of Japanese descent
People of the Philippine–American War
People of the Spanish–American War
Filipino generals
Military history of the Philippines
José Rizal